Michelangelo Morlaiter (Venice, 23 December 1729 – 1806) was an Italian painter, active mainly in Venice. He was one of the founding members and professor of the Accademia di Scoltura, Pittura, ed Architettura Civile in Venice in 1766.

His father, Giovanni Maria Morlaiter, was a prominent sculptor. One of Michelangelo's pupils was Francesco Maggiotto.

Works in Venice
 Palazzo Grassi, Frescoes
 Palazzo Palazzo Michiel dalle Colonne, stucco decoration
 Gallerie dell'Accademia, sala 18, Venice awards the arts.
 Church of San Bartolomeo, canvas in ceiling of presbytery, depicting San Bartolomeo in gloria.
 Church of Angelo San Raffaele, wall frescoes of Archangel Raphael and Tobias and ceiling 'God the Father in Glory of Angels.
 Church of San Moisè, Angels behind Meyring's statue at main altar

Other works
 Church of San Michele Arcangelo in Candiana, ceiling frescoes.
 Parochial church of Biancade in Roncade, altarpiece of Virgin and child with Saints Simon and Giuda.
 Palazzolo sull'Oglio, in Parrocchial Church, Coronation of the Virgin.

Notes 

1729 births
1806 deaths
18th-century Italian painters
Italian male painters
19th-century Italian painters
Painters from Venice
Academic staff of the Accademia di Belle Arti di Venezia
19th-century Italian male artists
18th-century Italian male artists